Daniela Bortoletto is an Italian high energy physicist, head of Particle Physics at the University of Oxford and Nicholas Kurti Senior Research Fellow in Physics at Brasenose College, University of Oxford. She works in silicon detector development and was a co-discoverer of both the Higgs boson and the top quark.

Early life and education 
Bortoletto grew up in the Italian Alps and studied at the University of Pavia, graduating summa cum laude with a bachelor's degree in physics. She was a member of Collegio Ghislieri in Pavia.  She earned her PhD in 1989 at Syracuse University, under the supervision of Sheldon Stone.

Research 
Bortoletto moved to Purdue University to pursue a postdoctoral fellowship. In 1994, she received a NSF Career Advancement Award and became the Alfred P. Sloan Research Fellow. While part of the CDF collaboration in 1995, she co-discovered the top quark. Two years later, she won a NSF Faculty Early Career Development Award. In 2004, she gained fellowship of the American Physical Society.

In 2010, Bortoletto became the E. M. Purcell Distinguished Professor of Physics at Purdue University. For seven years, she was the upgrade coordinator for the US CMS collaboration, part of the CMS experiment at the Large Hadron Collider at CERN. In 2013, she moved to the University of Oxford, and transferred from the CMS collaboration to the ATLAS collaboration, again working on the LHC. Her research focuses on silicon detector development. Bortoletto became a fellow of the Institute of Physics in 2015. She is an editor for the journal Nuclear Instruments and Methods in Physics Research Section A.

Since 2015, Bortoletto has set up and run the UK arm of the Conference for Undergraduate Women in Physics, held annually in Oxford.

References 

21st-century Italian physicists
Living people
Fellows of Brasenose College, Oxford
Italian women physicists
Particle physicists
University of Pavia alumni
Syracuse University alumni
Fellows of the American Physical Society
Purdue University faculty
People associated with CERN
Fellows of the Institute of Physics
Academic journal editors
Year of birth missing (living people)
Place of birth missing (living people)
Sloan Research Fellows